Janet Gunn (born as Janet Lynn Fulkerson on November 2, 1961 is an American actress. She appeared in films Night of the Running Man (1995) and The Quest (1996), and from 1996 to 1999 starred as Detective Cassandra St. John in the USA Network crime drama series, Silk Stalkings.

Early life
 
Gunn was born in Fort Worth, Texas. She graduated in 1980 from W.E. Boswell High School in Saginaw, Texas where she was active in school dramas and plays. She was also a varsity cheerleader and was elected Homecoming Queen her senior year. Standing at 5'3", she worked at a variety of jobs, including a car saleswoman, personal assistant, flight attendant with Southwest Airlines and as one of the Dallas Cowboy Cheerleaders for two seasons in the early 1980s. Her opening into acting came as Susan Howard's stunt double on the television series Dallas in 1988.

Career
Gunn had starring role of Kelly Cochran in the CBS series Dark Justice from 1992 to 1993. From 1996 to 1999, she starred as Detective Cassandra St. John on the USA Network series Silk Stalkings. Gunn also guest starred on In the Heat of the Night, Dream On, Diagnosis: Murder, CSI: Crime Scene Investigation and Crossing Jordan. Her film credits include Night of the Running Man (1995), The Quest (1996), The Nurse (1997), and Getting There (2002).

Filmography

Film

Television
 Dark Justice (1991) TV Series .... Kelly Cochrane (unknown episodes, 1992–1993)
 Renegade (1994) TV Series - Kat Calhoun
 Silk Stalkings .... Det. Sgt. Cassandra "Cassy" St. John / ... (38 episodes, 1996–1999)
 The Fugitive .... Becca Ross (2001)
 ''Everyone is Doing Great Judy Stewart...(2021)

References

External links

1961 births
Living people
Actresses from Texas
American film actresses
American stage actresses
American television actresses
Flight attendants
National Football League cheerleaders
People from Fort Worth, Texas
American cheerleaders
21st-century American women